War in Chad can refer to:
Chadian–Libyan conflict
Toyota War
Chadian Civil War (1965–79)
Chadian Civil War (2005–10)

See also
Chadian Civil War (disambiguation)